Annette Elizabeth Johnson (born August 13, 1974) is an American attorney and politician. She has represented the 134th District in the Texas House of Representatives since 2021. She is a member of the Democratic Party. Johnson is also an adjunct professor of law at South Texas College of Law Houston.

Career 

Early in her legal career, Johnson worked as an attorney for politicians Mike Martin, Craig Eiland, and Jack Brooks. Johnson also worked in the Legislative Affairs Office during the Clinton administration and in the Harris County District Attorney's Office.

Johnson successfully argued the case of a minor charged with prostitution in the 2010 case In re B.W, in which the Texas Supreme Court found that Johnson's client had not committed a crime because she could not legally consent to sex.

In 2020, she was elected to represent District 134 in the Texas House of Representatives, succeeding Republican incumbent Sarah Davis. She supports investments in public education, abortion rights, Medicaid expansion, and gun regulation.

Personal life 
Johnson is the daughter of former State Representative Jake Johnson and former Judge Carolyn Marks Johnson. Johnson married artist Sonya Cuellar in 2015 after the legalization of same-sex marriage. They have 3 rescue dogs.

Electoral history

References

External links
 Campaign website
 State legislative page

1974 births
Politicians from Houston
University of Texas at Austin alumni
South Texas College of Law alumni
21st-century American women lawyers
21st-century American lawyers
21st-century American women politicians
American lawyers
Texas lawyers
Democratic Party members of the Texas House of Representatives
LGBT state legislators in Texas
Lesbian politicians
LGBT lawyers
Women state legislators in Texas
Living people
21st-century American politicians
21st-century LGBT people